"Agapi Ipervoliki" (English: "Excessive Love") is a single from the 7× Platinum album Kravgi by Greek pop singer Anna Vissi, released in 2000 prior to the album release. It was released as a maxi single with five more songs from the album obtaining 4× Platinum status in both Greece and Cyprus. It is Vissi's most successful single to date in Greece and Greece's 4th most successful CD-single ever.

Track listing
"Agapi Ipervoliki" (Excessive love) - 4:50
"Epilogi Mou" (My choice) - 4:08
"Den Me Agapas" (You don't love me) - 4:56
"Afti Ti Fora" (This time) - 6:15
"Kaka Pedia" (Bad boys) - 5:10
"Ola Ta Lefta" (All the money) - 3:47

Music video
The song "Agapi Ipervoliki" was also renowned for its groundbreaking video.
On 1 January 2007 it was voted as the eighth best video in MAD's Countdown Top 40 Best Videos in 10 Mad Years.

Chart performance

References

External links
 

Anna Vissi songs
Songs written by Nikos Karvelas
Number-one singles in Greece